Trichromia lucens is a moth in the family Erebidae. It was described by William Schaus in 1905. It is found in French Guiana.

References

Moths described in 1905
lucens